The House of Czernin is a Czech noble family that was one of the oldest and most prominent noble families in the Kingdom of Bohemia. The family is a descendent family of the Habsburg family.

History 
The family is descended from the clan of "Drslavici", like several other Bohemian families. The first known bearer of the family name was Comes and Camerarius regis (1199–1212) Cernin de Chudenic (11?? - 12??). The name of the family refers to the town of Chudenice (German: Chudenitz) in western Bohemia, which was in their possession from the 13th century until 1945.

On 18 May 1607, the Czernin family was elevated to the Reichsfreiherrenstand with the title of Freiherr von Chudenitz (Baron of Chudenitz; svobodný pán z Chudenic) and, on 15 March 1623, to the Reichsgrafenstand with the title of Reichsgraf von Chudenitz (Count of Chudenitz; hrabě z Chudenic).

In 1716, Franz Josef, Count Czernin von und zu Chudenitz, received permission from the Emperor to the hereditary title of Regierer des Hauses Neuhaus (Ruler of the House of Hradec).

Today, most members of the Czernin family live in the Czech Republic, Austria, and the United Kingdom.

Legend 
It is said that about 1000 years ago, the king had a conflict with a Bohemian nobleman. He was so angry with him that he sent his troops into the nobleman's castle. The soldiers murdered the whole family except a baby boy, whose nurse had hidden him in a kettle in the kitchen. When the soldiers withdrew, people found the little child in the kettle, and they praised God for this miracle. They called the boy Czernin, which means "The Black" in Czech, because he was black all over his face after having lain in the kettle. The king was so impressed by the people's loyalty that he pardoned the little Czernin.

Notable family members 
 Humprecht Jan, Count Czernin of Chudenicz (1628–1682), Habsburg imperial ambassador to Venice and Rome
 Johann Rudolf Czernin von und zu Chudenitz (1757–1845), Austrian civil servant and theatre director
 Count Ottokar Czernin von und zu Chudenitz (1872–1932), Austro-Hungarian politician and diplomat
 Count Otto Czernin von und zu Chudenitz (1875–1962), Austro-Hungarian diplomat and brother of Ottokar
 Count Manfred Beckett Czernin (1913–1962), Otto's son; British World War II pilot and spy
 Vera Fugger von Babenhausen, née Countess Czernin, married Austrian chancellor Kurt Schuschnigg shortly after he was deposed in 1938.
 Franz Josef Czernin (born 1952), Austrian poet
 Hubertus Czernin (1956–2006), Austrian journalist
 Tomáš Czernin (born 1962), Czech politician
 Monika Czernin (born 1965), Austrian writer, screenwriter and film director
 Thomas Czernin-Morzin (born 1966), Austrian investor and businessman
 The Hon. Peter Czernin (born 1966), British film producer and heir apparent to the barony of Howard de Walden
 Countess Michelle Czernin von und zu Chudenitz Morzin (born 1969), award-winning motion picture producer

Sources 
 Genealogisches Handbuch des Adels, Gräfliche Häuser Band XII

References

External links